Mediaster is a genus of starfish in the family Goniasteridae. It was circumscribed in 1857 by William Stimpson for M. aequalis, the genus's type species. Its junior synonym is the genus Isaster, which was circumscribed in 1894 by Addison Emery Verrill for the species now known as M. bairdi. Verrill himself synonymized the two genus names in 1899.

Species
, the World Register of Marine Species lists the following species as being in the genus:

Mediaster aequalis Stimpson, 1857
Mediaster arcuatus (Sladen, 1889)
Mediaster australiensis H.L. Clark, 1916
Mediaster bairdi (Verrill, 1882)
Mediaster boardmani (Livingstone, 1934)
Mediaster brachiatus Goto, 1914
Mediaster capensis H.L. Clark, 1923
Mediaster gartrelli H.E.S. Clark, 2001
Mediaster murrayi Macan, 1938
Mediaster ornatus Fisher, 1906
Mediaster pedicellaris (Perrier, 1881)
Mediaster praestans Livingstone, 1933
Mediaster sladeni Benham, 1909
Mediaster tenellus Fisher, 1905
Mediaster transfuga Ludwig, 1905

References

Goniasteridae